Rhoda Blumberg (December 13, 1917 – June 6, 2016) was an American author of historical books for children.

Early life
She was born Rhoda Shapiro in Brooklyn, New York on December 13, 1917. Her mother was a founder of the Mizrachi Women's Organization of America, a religious Zionist group, her father was in the garment business. She attended Girls High School in Brooklyn and took her bachelor's degree in philosophy from Adelphi College in 1937.

Career and writing
In her early career she worked for CBS radio and did some magazine writing under the pen name of "Rhoda Roder." Blumberg began writing books in the 1960s, including First Travel Guide to the Moon and First Travel Guide to the Bottom of the Sea. She began writing historical books for children when she was in her mid-50s. All told she wrote over two dozen books.
 Her book Commodore Perry in the Land of the Shogun was the Newbery Honor book for literature from the Association for Library Service to Children in 1986. and the Boston Globe–Horn Book Award for 1985. She won the Golden Kite Award for non-fiction twice:  in 1986 for Commodore Perry in the Land of the Shogun and again in 1988 for The Incredible Journey of Lewis and Clark.

Selected bibliography

Personal life
She married attorney Gerald Blumberg (deceased - 2009) in 1945.  In 1951, they moved from Brooklyn, NY to a small farm in Westchester County, where she lived the remainder of her life. They had one son and three daughters. She died on June 6, 2016 at her home in Yorktown Heights, N.Y.

External links
Rhoda Blumberg at the Open Library

References

1917 births
2016 deaths
American women children's writers
American children's writers
Girls' High School alumni
Adelphi University alumni
21st-century American women